In British rugby league system, the qualifiers was a competition that was played at the end of the regular rugby league season in the Middle 8 of the Super 8s.

Structure
At the end of 23 rounds of the regular season, the bottom 4 teams in the Super League and top 4 teams in the Championship play each other home or away in a league of 8. The top three teams automatically earn a place in the Super League. The 4th and 5th placed teams play in the Million Pound Game for the final Super League place.

Results

Bold Promoted/ Relegated

Winners

Appearances

Statistics

Match records

Highest Scoring Game

Biggest Win

Lowest scoring game

Attendances

Highest attendance

Lowest attendance

See also

References

External links

Super League
Championship (rugby league)